Charles Dodd was an English historian.

Charles Dodd may also refer to:

C. H. Dodd (Charles Harold Dodd), Welsh theologian
Charles J. Dodd, American lawyer, politician, and judge from New York
Charles Edward Shuter Dodd, on List of ambassadors of the United Kingdom to Panama

See also
Charles Dodds, British biochemist
Dodd (surname)